Dominic Waxing Lyrical is a musical band from Edinburgh. The band is centered around their frontman, musician and songwriter Dominic Harris.

History
Formed in 1994 by Dominic Harris and Joel Sanderson, the band's music and performances incorporated influences from medieval and renaissance poetry, and performance art. They first appeared on the UK indie music scene in the mid 90s. During which time they performed live and released and a series of singles and an eponymous LP. Their music received radio plays from John Peel. And they were covered in Zines and Melody Maker.

In 2015, they released a second album, Woodland Casual, and a series of singles, featuring musicians from Aberfeldy, Clean George IV and Badgewearer. The band also toured Central Scotland. The tour was performed on a barge, and included a date at Saughton Prison. 

The band release a third album Rural Tonic in 2017 with orchestral players from Mr McFall's Chamber. They were subsequently recorded by the BBC in session with Mr McFall's Chamber and played on BBC Radio by Lauren Laverne and Vic Galloway.

The band are reported to have recorded a fourth album in the United States with Ricky White of Kling Klang and Oi Polloi.

Discography

Albums
 Dominic Waxing Lyrical, Neptunes (1995)
 Woodland Casual, Tenement Records (2015)
 Rural Tonic, Tenement Records (2017)

Singles
 Victoria, Bosque 7" (1995)
 Change, Bosque 7" (1997)
 Dear Sir/Madam..., Bosque EP (1998)
 Part-Timers , House of Dubois EP (1998)
 Thursday (Searching), Tenement Records (2014)
 Fly, Tenement Records (2015)
 Swan Song, Tenement Records (2015)
 Susan Sontag, Tenement Records (2017)

Tracks on compilations
 Drowning, King, Cold Shoulder City and Roll Up! (acoustic versions) on Gallery - Edinburgh Songwriters' Showcase, Deadbeat (1994)
 Piss Staines, on Looking At The Earth From Neptune, And It Was Good, Neptunes (1996)
 Fly, Scarecrow, Lara and Cold Shoulder City on ...boats against the current..., Hedonist Productions (1996)

References 

Musical groups from Edinburgh
Scottish folk music groups